George B. Harper (August 17, 1866 in Milwaukee, Wisconsin – December 11, 1931 in Stockton, California) was a pitcher for Major League Baseball in the 19th century. He played in 12 games for the Philadelphia Phillies during the 1894 season and 16 games for the Brooklyn Bridegrooms during the 1896 season. His minor league career lasted from 1886 through 1901, mostly in the California League. He managed the Stockton Millers in 1914.

Sources

1866 births
1931 deaths
Baseball players from Stockton, California
Brooklyn Bridegrooms players
Philadelphia Phillies players
Baseball players from Milwaukee
Major League Baseball pitchers
19th-century baseball players
Milwaukee Brewers (minor league) players
LaCrosse Freezers players
Omaha Omahogs players
Oakland Greenhood & Morans players
Sacramento Senators players
San Jose Dukes players
Stockton River Pirates players
Detroit Creams players
Nashville Tigers players
Rochester Browns players
Scranton Miners players
Scranton Red Sox players
Rochester Patriots players
Ottawa Wanderers players
Watsonville Hayseeds players
Watsonville Gardiners players
Sacramento Gilt Edges players
Oakland Oaks (baseball) players
Stockton Wasps players
Minor league baseball managers